Charles Joan Marie Adriaan van Rooy (23 January 1912 – 1 August 1996) was a Dutch politician of the defunct Catholic People's Party (KVP), which is now merged into the Christian Democratic Appeal (CDA).

He started his career as the mayor of Hontenisse on 15 November 1939, on 22 January 1944 he was fired by the Germans and went into hiding. After Hontenisse was freed, he became mayor again in November 1944 till 16 December 1945. Subsequently he became mayor of Etten-Leur (16 December 1945 – 1 May 1952), Venlo (1 May 1952 – 1 May 1957), and Eindhoven (1 May 1957 – 19 May 1959). From 19 May 1959 he served as the Minister of Social Affairs and Health under the catholic prime minister Jan de Quay, his friendship with De Quay was probably one of the reasons he unexpectedly became minister. His career as a minister ended after only two years (3 July 1961), after his child benefit plans were met with great criticism. His continued his political career as mayor of Heerlen (16 January 1962 – 1 January 1964) and ended it as governor of Limburg (1 January 1964 – 1 February 1977).

Decorations

References

External links

Official
  Mr.Dr. Ch.J.M.A. (Charles) van Rooy Parlement & Politiek

1912 births
1996 deaths
Catholic People's Party politicians
Dutch jurists
Dutch nonprofit directors
Dutch Roman Catholics
Grand Officers of the Order of Orange-Nassau
Knights of the Order of the Netherlands Lion
King's and Queen's Commissioners of Limburg
Maastricht University alumni
Mayors of Heerlen
Mayors of Eindhoven
Mayors in North Brabant
People from Etten-Leur
Mayors of Venlo
Ministers of Health of the Netherlands
Ministers of Social Affairs of the Netherlands
People from Heerlen
Politicians from Rotterdam
Radboud University Nijmegen alumni
20th-century Dutch civil servants
20th-century Dutch politicians